Cyathula officinalis (English common names:  Cyathula root, Radix Cyathula, ox knee, Chinese:  chuan niu xi), is a species of Cyathula native to the China (Guizhou, Hebei, Shanxi, Sichuan, Yunnan, Zhejiang) and Nepal.  Its IPNI number is 60176-1.

References

 K. C. Kuan, Acta Phytotax. Sin. 14(1): 60 (1976)

External links
 GBIF portal - Cyathula officinalis

Amaranthaceae
Plants used in traditional Chinese medicine